Kodaku people are an indigenous people who live in India. They live in the hills and forest of Chhotanagpur, the bordering area of Chhattisgarh, Jharkhand and Uttar Pradesh. Their mother tongue, a Munda language, is also called Kodaku. Some Kodaku people speak Korwa as their mother tongue. They also speak Sadri, Chhattisgarhi, or Kurukh as their second language.
The Kodaku people are mainly concentrated in the northeastern area of Surguja district in Chhattishgarh, southern parts of Palamau, Gadhwa in Jharkhand and the southeastern region of Sonabhadra district of Uttar Pradesh.
Kodaku people are now included in Scheduled Tribes by government of India. (along with Abij Maria and Korba community)

References

Ethnic groups in India
Scheduled Tribes of India
Munda languages
Social groups of Uttar Pradesh